Santiago ("Yago") Lamela Tobío (July 24, 1977 – May 8, 2014) was a Spanish athlete competing in the long jump. His greatest year was 1999, when he jumped 8.56 during the indoor season to win the silver medal at the 1999 World Indoor Championships. Later that year he set a new outdoors personal best with 8.56, and won another silver medal at the World Championships. His 8.56 m jump stayed as European indoor long jump record for ten years.

In June, 2011, the ex-athlete was admitted to the psychiatric ward of the San Agustin de Avilés hospital.  He suffered from chronic depression.

On May 8, 2014, Lamela was found dead at his parents' house. The coroner announced a heart attack as the cause of death. Lamela was 36.

Personal bests
Long jump - 8.56 (1999)
Triple jump - 16.72 (1998)

Competition record

References

External links

1977 births
2014 deaths
People from Avilés
Spanish male long jumpers
Olympic athletes of Spain
Athletes (track and field) at the 2000 Summer Olympics
Athletes (track and field) at the 2004 Summer Olympics
World Athletics Championships athletes for Spain
World Athletics Championships medalists
European Athletics Championships medalists